Borinka is a village and municipality in western Slovakia in Malacky District in the Bratislava Region, at the foothills of the Little Carpathians, best known for the Pajštún Castle, and has many weekend homes. Dračí hrádok are another castle ruins located in its vicinity. The village is around 5 km east of Stupava and around 15 km north of Bratislava.

Names and etymology
Older Slovak name Pajštún derives from German Ballenstein or Paulenstein. The current name Borinka (1948) is a result of mistake. Pajštún was incorrectly associated with Szuhabaranka (1273 castrum Borynka) and renamed during post-war trials to return to older Slovak names.

Geography
The village lies at an altitude of 235 metres and covers an area of 15.79 km². It has population of 512 people.

Genealogical resources

The records for genealogical research are available at the state archive "Statny 
Archiv in Bratislava, Slovakia"

 Roman Catholic church records (births/marriages/deaths): 1670-1921 (parish B)

See also
 List of municipalities and towns in Slovakia

References

External links

 Municipal website 
https://web.archive.org/web/20071116010355/http://www.statistics.sk/mosmis/eng/run.html
Surnames of living people in Borinka

Villages and municipalities in Malacky District